The Sea of Zanj is a former name for that portion of the western Indian Ocean adjacent to the region in the African Great Lakes referred to by medieval Arab geographers as Zanj. The Sea of Zanj was deemed a fearful zone by Arab mariners and legends regarding dangers in the waters abounded, especially near its far southern limits.

Geography
The term was applied to the sea expanses near the eastern portion of the African continent known by ancient Muslim travelers and chroniclers such as Al Masudi and Ibn Batuta.

Although geographically insufficiently defined, the area of the Sea of Zanj included a vast maritime region roughly stretching as far as ancient navigators reached on their dhows. Subject to Monsoon wind variations, the Sea of Zanj was located to the south of the Erythraean Sea. It stretched off the coast of Southeast Africa as far south as the Mozambique Channel, including the Comoros and the waters off the eastern coast of Madagascar. On its eastern side the sea extended west of the Seychelles and to the northwest of the islands of the Mascarenes.

See also
Zanzibar

References

Bodies of water of Africa
Zanj
Borders of Madagascar
Borders of Mauritius
History of geography